Para-cycling at the 2018 Asian Para Games in Jakarta took place between 8 and 13 October 2018.

Medal table

Medalists

Road cycling
Men

Women

Track cycling
Men

Women

See also
Cycling at the 2017 ASEAN Para Games
Cycling at the 2018 Asian Games

References

External links
 Para Cycling - Asian Para Games 2018
 RESULT SYSTEM - ASIAN PARA GAMES JAKARTA 2018

2018 Asian Para Games events